Marshall Chapin (February 27, 1798 – December 26, 1836) was a medical doctor, pharmacist, and public servant from Detroit, Michigan.

Early life
Marshall Chapin was born in Bernardston, Massachusetts in 1798, one of nine children of Dr. Caleb Chapin and his wife Mary.  The family later moved to Caledonia, New York, where Marshall went to school.  He took a medical course at Geneva Academy (now Hobart and William Smith Colleges), and studied medicine with an uncle in Buffalo, New York.  He received his medical degree in 1819.

In 1823, Chapin married Mary Crosby.  The couple had four children: Louisa, Helen, Charles, and Marshall.

Detroit
In 1819 Chapin moved to Detroit, and, with the help of his uncle, established the first drugstore there, as well as going into private practice as a physician.  He was soon appointed physician for Fort Shelby.  He went into public service, serving as an alderman in 1826 and 1827 and mayor in 1831 and 1833.  He was appointed City Physician during the cholera epidemic of 1832, and served as same during the second outbreak in 1834.

Marshall Chapin died of heart disease on December 26, 1838. His drugstore continued in business under his son-in-law's name, and others, well into the 1880s.

References

1798 births
1836 deaths
19th-century American physicians
Mayors of Detroit
Politicians from Detroit
People from Bernardston, Massachusetts
People from Caledonia, New York
19th-century American politicians